Elizabeth Jolas (born 5 August 1926) is a Franco-American composer.

Biography
Jolas was born in Paris in 1926. Her mother, the American translator Maria McDonald, was a singer. Her father, the poet and journalist Eugene Jolas, founded and edited the magazine transition, which published over ten years most of the great names of the interwar period.

Her family settled in the United States in late 1940. While completing her general studies in New York, then specializing in music at Bennington College, she joined the Dessoff Choirs, thus discovering notably Renaissance music which was to have a lasting influence on her work.

Having returned to Paris in 1946, Jolas resumed her studies at the Conservatoire national supérieur de musique, notably with Darius Milhaud and Olivier Messiaen. From 1971 to 1974 she served as Messiaen's assistant at the Conservatoire and was appointed herself to the faculty in 1975. She has since then also taught in the United States, at Yale, Harvard, Mills College (D. Milhaud chair), the University of California campuses at Berkeley, Los Angeles, and San Diego, at Tanglewood and the University of Michigan.

Jolas is a member of the American Academy of Arts and Letters (1983) and of the American Academy of Arts and Sciences (1995).

After graduating from Bennington College, Jolas returned to Paris in 1946 to continue her studies with Milhaud and Messiaen at the Conservatoire national supérieur de musique of Paris.

Her numerous works (she has been composing steadily since 1945) are written for a great variety of combinations and have been widely performed internationally by artists such as Kent Nagano, Anssi Karttunen, Claude Delangle, William Christie, Håkan Hardenberger, Antoine Tamestit, Nicolas Hodges and Sir Simon Rattle, and leading ensembles and orchestras including: the Ensemble intercontemporain, the Berlin Philharmonic, the Orchestre de Paris, the Boston Symphony Orchestra, and the BBC Symphony Orchestra.

Among Jolas's notable students is the composer Robert Carl.

Style

Through her family background, Jolas was confronted at an early age with words and the singing voice and this may have protected her from some musical excesses of the post-war music world. An early follower of Pierre Boulez's Domaine musical in the 1960s, she was always more a "fellow-traveler" than an unconditional disciple. Her music clearly sounds contemporary, if only for being consistently atonal. Yet, unlike most composers of her generation, Jolas never encouraged a break with the past and her keen knowledge of tradition is often felt to inform her creative drive. She has indeed openly admitted many times her ambition to write expressive and beautiful music when such considerations were deemed outdated.

List of major works
 For an extended list, see List of compositions by Betsy Jolas.

Operas
 Le Pavillon au Bord de la Rivière (1975), chamber opera in 4 acts
 Schliemann (1982–83), opera in 3 acts
 Le Cyclope (1986), chamber opera in 1 act

Orchestral
 D'un opéra de voyage (1967) for chamber orchestra
 Quatre Plages (1967) for string orchestra
 Well Met (1973) for string orchestra
 Tales of a summer sea (1977) for orchestra
 Cinq pièces pour Boulogne (1982)
 B Day (2006) for symphony orchestra
 A Little Summer Suite (2015)

Solo works with orchestra or ensemble
 Points D'Aube (1968) for viola and ensemble
 Musique d'hiver (1971) for organ and small orchestra
 Trois Rencontres (1973) for solo string trio and symphony orchestra
 Stances (1978) for piano and orchestra
 Histoires vraies (2015) double concerto for trumpet and piano
 Side Roads (2017) for cello and string orchestra
 b Tunes for Nicolas (2021) piano concerto for Nicolas Hodges and BBC Symphony Orchestra

Works for large ensemble
 Figures (1965) for 9 instruments
 J.D.E. (1966) for 14 musicians
 D'un opéra de poupée en sept musiques (1982) for 11 instruments
 Préludes, Fanfares, Interludes, Sonneries (1983) for wind band
 Sonate à 8 (1998) for cello octet

Chamber music
 Quartet Nos. 1–6 (1956–1997)
 O Wall (1976) for wind quintet
 Quatuor VII (Afterthoughts) (2018) for trumpet, violin, viola and cello
 Episode No. 1–9 (1964–1990) for various solo instruments
 B for Sonata (1973) for piano
 Musique de jour (1976) for organ
 Signets, hommage à Maurice Ravel (1987) for piano
 Femme le soir (2018) for cello and piano

Chorus 
 Mass (1945) for choir, soloists and orchestra
 Motet I–IV (1947–2002) for various voices, chorus, orchestra, ensemble
 Enfantillages (1956) for women's or children's choir in 3 equal voices
 L'oeil égaré dans les plis de l'obéissance au vent, cantate radiophonique (1961) for soprano, contralto, baritone, mixed choir and orchestra
 Dans la chaleur vacante, cantate radiophonique (1963) for choir and orchestra
 Autres enfantillages (2000) for children's or women's choir with clarinet ad libitum

Vocal
 Mots (1963) for soprano and ensemble
 Quartet No. 2 (1964) for soprano and string trio
 Liring Ballade (1980) for baritone and orchestra
 Sigrancia-Ballade (1995) for baritone and orchestra
 L'Ascension du Mont Ventoux (2004) for soprano, narrator, flute, clarinet, violin, cello and harp

Honors
Officier de la Légion d'honneur (2006)
Prix de l'Académie Charles Cros pour l'ensemble de son œuvre (2015)
Officier de l'Ordre du Mérite (2003)
Berlin Prize (2000)
Commandeur des Arts et des Lettres (1985)
Prix International Maurice Ravel (1992)
Grand prix de la SACEM(1982)
Grand Prix de la Ville de Paris (1981)
Prix National de la Musique (1974)
Koussevitzky Prize (1974)
Copley Foundation award (1954)

References

Bibliography 
 J. Briscoe: "Betsy Jolas: Plupart du Temps II", Contemporary Anthology of Music by Women (Bloomington and Indianapolis, 1997)
 J. Briscoe (2011/2012) "Jolas, Betsy". Grove Dictionary of American Music, 2nd ed. 2012. Oxford Music Online.
 D. Henahan: "Betsy Jolas Winning Recognition in the USA", The New York Times (30 August 1976)
 B. Jolas: Molto espressivo (Paris, 1999) [collected writings]
 V. Perlis: "Recordings in Review: Betsy Jolas", The Yale Review (1995), 179–185
 B. Serrou: "Betsy Jolas. D'un opéra de voyage". Foreword by Henri Dutilleux, Edition Cig'art, 2001.

External links
, 
Interview with Betsy Jolas, July 17, 1991

1926 births
Living people
20th-century classical composers
20th-century women composers
20th-century American musicians
French composers
French classical composers
French women classical composers
Berlin Prize recipients
Conservatoire de Paris alumni
Academic staff of the Conservatoire de Paris
Commandeurs of the Ordre des Arts et des Lettres
Members of the American Academy of Arts and Letters
Musicians from Paris
Pupils of Darius Milhaud